TROS, originally an acronym for Televisie Radio Omroep Stichting ("Television Radio Broadcasting Foundation"), was a Dutch television and radio organisation part of the Dutch public broadcasting system. This broadcasting association was particularly well known for its entertainment programmes, quizzes and focus on Dutch folk music in programmes like  and the digital channel TROS Sterren TV.

In 2014 TROS merged with fellow broadcaster AVRO to form AVROTROS.

History
A group of entrepreneurs who disliked the type and amount of TV shown by the single public broadcasting channel in the Netherlands acquired a North Sea off-shore drilling platform - the REM Island - and mounted a TV transmitter and started broadcast to American TV-shows like Mr. Ed, the talking horse.

This new unofficial TV proved quite popular, but was shut down by a government raid, as the government claimed the islands transmitter trespassed frequency spectrum regulations. Due to the popular outcry and political turmoil caused by this venture, the entrepreneurs jumped on the offered opportunity to go legitimate, as an addition to the 5 private broadcasting associations that were distributed time slots based on their membership in the Dutch public broadcasting system. They founded TROS.

TROS was established in 1964 and grew rapidly.

Its arrival was a different development in the area as it did not originate in religious or political beginnings of the other broadcasters, but aimed at providing programmes that its viewers wished to see.

It soon became obvious that viewers mostly preferred American television series and light-hearted programs. Other television and radio stations began to follow suit to maintain an audience. To describe this phenomenon, the name, 'TROS', was even turned into a verb. This was mostly a point of contention in the 1970s, as some did not think that older television and radio stations should bow to the pleasure and superficiality of the average viewers. It was thought that they should continue focusing on issues such as education, culture, politics etc. These had been the main staple of those stations. However, the competition to TROS proved stronger in principle than in practice.

In 1988, the station made a first attempt at commercialising its business. In 2004, TROS celebrated its 40th anniversary.

The TROS publishes two television guides: Tros Kompas and TV-krant.

TROS programmes

TV

Game shows
 Lingo; originally produced for VARA, its later series moved to TROS.
 Éen tegen 100, the original Dutch version of the international format 1 vs. 100.
 Miljoenenjacht, a game show produced with the Nationale Postcode Loterij, and known for having originated the international format Deal or No Deal.
 Te land, ter zee en in de lucht
 De leukste thuis (The family jester), a Funniest Home Videos-like programme.

Consumer's and safety programmes
 TROS Radar, a consumer's rights programme in which consumers are assisted in helping challenge corporations and governmental organisations.
 Opgelicht (Scammed), a programme tracing scammers and frauds together with their victims, and giving tips on how to avoid being scammed.
 Vermist (Missing), in which Jaap Jongbloed goes on a search for missing people.

Informational
 EenVandaag (One Today), a daily news bulletin and documentary (with the AVRO)
 TROS TV Show, a weekly chat show.

Entertainment
 Dit was het nieuws, a satirical view on the recent news (Dutch version of "Have I Got News for You").
 Bassie en Adriaan, an extremely popular children's series from the 1980s and 90s (no longer broadcast by TROS).
 Spoed (urgency), a hospital soap.

Music
 The Kids Top 20 is a Flemish and Dutch music programme aimed to children aged 6 to 12 years. The first episode was broadcast on 12 January 2003.

Radio 
Broadcast from 23 August 1973 until 28. November 1985 on Hilversum 3 and from 5 December 1985 until 1 October 1992 on Radio 3:
. 
 Soulshow
 Havermoutshow
 Europarade
 Polderpopparade
 50 Pop Of Een Envelop
 TROS Top 50
 Nationale Hitparade
 Mega Top 50
 Somertijd
 Dancetrax
 LP en CD Show
 Gouden Uren
 Poster
 Nieuwsshow (News show on NPO Radio 1)

References

External links

 Official website

Netherlands Public Broadcasting
Dutch-language television networks
Television channels and stations established in 1964
Radio stations established in 1964
Dutch companies established in 1964
Dutch public broadcasting organisations